Lianella Carell (6 May 1927 – 22 December 2000) was an Italian film actress and screenwriter. She appeared in 18 films between 1948 and 1958. She is perhaps best known for playing Maria Ricci, the wife of the protagonist in the 1948 Vittorio De Sica film Bicycle Thieves, which was also her acting debut.

Filmography

References

External links

1927 births
2000 deaths
Italian film actresses
20th-century Italian screenwriters
Actresses from Rome
20th-century Italian actresses